Peru Municipal Airport (I76) is a public airport  northwest of Peru, in Miami County, Indiana. The airport was founded in March 1971.

References

External links 

 http://www.airnav.com/airport/I76
 https://web.archive.org/web/20140808041202/http://www.cityofperu.org/airport.html

Airports in Indiana
Transportation buildings and structures in Miami County, Indiana